Francis Locke Jr. (October 31, 1766 – January 8, 1823) was a U.S. senator from the state of North Carolina.

Family
Francis Locke was the son of Francis Locke Sr. (1722–1796) (a Revolutionary War participant) and Anne Brandon (b.abt. 1737). All are buried at Thyatira Cemetery in Rowan County, North Carolina.

Career
A native of Rowan County, North Carolina, and a judge of the Superior Court of North Carolina from 1803 to 1814, he was elected to the Senate in 1814 to fill a vacancy caused by the resignation of David Stone, but resigned in 1815, before he could qualify.

References
NC Manual of 1913

1776 births
1823 deaths
United States senators from North Carolina
North Carolina Democratic-Republicans
North Carolina state court judges
People from Rowan County, North Carolina